"Thank You" is a song by American rock band Sevendust. The song was released as the lead single from their eleventh studio album, titled Kill the Flaw on July 27, 2015. The song including a group of children as background vocals. "It’s one of those things where it can be very cool, or it can be very Nickelodeon," says Clint Lowery.  The song was nominated for Best Metal Performance for the 2016 Grammy Awards.

Track listing

Charts

References

Sevendust songs
2015 singles
2015 songs
Songs written by Clint Lowery
Songs written by Morgan Rose
Songs written by Lajon Witherspoon